Sergey Mikhailovich Drozdov (born 23 October 1969) is a retired Kazakhstani professional water polo player who last competed at the 2002 Asian Games as a member of the Kazakhstan men's national water polo team. He is currently serves as a coach of the Kazakhstan men's national team and coach of the team Astana SK in Astana.

Ranks 
World class master of sports
Honored coach of the Republic of Kazakhstan

Achievements

As player

Water Polo Club Spartak Volgograd 
2-fold winner Cup of Russia (2005, 2007)
Champion of Russia (2008–09)

Hapoel Tel Aviv 
3-fold winner Cup of Israel 
3-fold Champion of Israel

Kazakhstan men's national water polo team 
3-fold champion Asian games (1994, 1998, 2002)
3-fold champion of Asia (1995, 2001, 2003)
 Champion of Asian Beach Games (2008)
Participant of the Olympic Games (2000, 2004)

As coach

Kazakhstan men's national water polo team 
 Champion of Asian Games (2010)
 Champion of Asia (2012)
 Runners - up of the championship of Asia (2008)
 Champion of Asian Beach Games (2010)

References

External links
 

1969 births
Living people
Sportspeople from Almaty
Soviet male water polo players
Kazakhstani male water polo players
Olympic water polo players of Kazakhstan
Water polo players at the 2000 Summer Olympics
Water polo players at the 2004 Summer Olympics
Water polo players at the 1994 Asian Games
Water polo players at the 1998 Asian Games
Water polo players at the 2002 Asian Games
Asian Games gold medalists for Kazakhstan
Asian Games medalists in water polo
Medalists at the 1994 Asian Games
Medalists at the 1998 Asian Games
Medalists at the 2002 Asian Games
Kazakhstani water polo coaches
Kazakhstan men's national water polo team coaches
Water polo coaches at the 2012 Summer Olympics
Kazakhstani expatriate sportspeople in Israel
Kazakhstani expatriate sportspeople in Russia